Davide Taini (born 7 December 1976) is a retired Swiss association footballer.

At the end of the 2013–14 season, he retired from professional football at the age of 37.

Honours
FC Zürich
Swiss Cup: 2004–05
Super League/Nationalliga A: 2005–06

References

External links
www.football.ch profile

Swiss men's footballers
Swiss expatriate footballers
FC Winterthur players
FC Zürich players
FC Wil players
Grasshopper Club Zürich players
Swiss Super League players
Expatriate footballers in Germany
Association football goalkeepers
1976 births
Living people
Place of birth missing (living people)